Punggol East Single Member Constituency was a single member constituency (SMC) located in the north-eastern area of Singapore.

Following the release of the Electoral Boundaries Review committee report for the 2020 general elections, Punggol East SMC was merged into the 4-member Sengkang Group Representation Constituency (GRC).

History
Punggol East SMC was the sole constituency to feature a three-cornered contest for the election. The election was won by People's Action Party's Michael Palmer, who was the incumbent MP of the ward with 54.54% of the votes, beating Workers' Party's newcomer Lee Li Lian and Singapore Democratic Alliance's secretary-general Desmond Lim, who garnered 41.01% and 4.45% of the votes, respectively in the 2011 general election. As Lim has garnered less than the 12.5% vote threshold, his election deposit was forfeited by the election department.

Following Palmer's resignation on December, the ward was placed in the care of Teo Ser Luck. On 9 January 2013, a By-Election 2013 for the ward was announced to be held on 26 January. On 10 January, PAP unveiled their candidate for the by-election, Dr Koh Poh Koon, while both WP's Lee and SDA's Lim had returned to contest the by-election. The election also featured a fourth candidate, the Secretary-general of Reform Party, Kenneth Jeyaretnam.

There were two rounds of rallies in this by-election, Workers' Party's rally drew the most audiences amounting ranging 5,000 to 12,000 audiences, while Singapore Democratic Alliance using the social media and technology to draw audiences via a series of videos posted to YouTube.

During the vote counting, SDA's Desmond Lim officially conceded defeat. Jeyaretnam and Lim both lost their election deposit in this by-election. At 0.57%, Lim also set a record for the lowest percentage garnered in an election since post-independence Singapore.

WP's Lee won the by-election for the party with 16,038 votes, or 54.52% (Including overseas votes, the percentage of valid votes cast were 54.50%, or 16,045 votes), marking the second by-election where an opposition had won a parliament seat from the ruling party. She was sworn in at the Parliament on 4 February 2013, and held her Meet-The-People session on the same day. After Lee's victory of the SMC, Aljunied-Hougang Town Council went for a merger with Punggol East to achieve economics of scale named Aljunied-Hougang-Punggol East Town Council.

During the 2015 general election, Lee went to defend her seat but lost to PAP's Charles Chong with 48.24% of the votes.

During the 2020 general election, the ward was absorbed into a new Sengkang GRC for the 2020 general election, after the Electoral Boundaries Review Committee (EBRC) released its report on 13 March 2020. Sengkang GRC was won by WP, putting the area back in the hands of WP. After the election, the area division was renamed "Rivervale" by WP and "Sengkang East" by PAP.

Member of Parliament

Electoral results

Elections in 2010s

References

External link 
 Result of 2011 General Election
 Resignation of Michael Palmer, MP, Punggol East SMC

2011 establishments in Singapore
2020 disestablishments in Singapore
Singaporean electoral divisions
Sengkang
Constituencies established in 2011
Constituencies disestablished in 2020